Al Ruscio (June 2, 1924 – November 12, 2013) was an American character actor who appeared in numerous television shows and films.

Early life
Ruscio was born in Salem, Massachusetts on June 2, 1924. He graduated from Salem High School, after graduating college he moved to New York City. During World War II, Ruscio served in the United States Army Air Corps.

Career 
Ruscio trained for two years at The Neighborhood Playhouse School for the Theater. He played many roles in New York and in summer stock, including co-starring with Steve McQueen and Kim Stanley among others. His first work in live television came in New York City. He moved to Los Angeles in 1958. His first role there was Tony in Al Capone with Rod Steiger (1958). He then appeared in many television shows including Gunsmoke (1958), 77 Sunset Strip (1959), Bonanza (1960–1961), and in Peter Gunn (1961).

He also acted in soap operas including Port Charles, Days of Our Lives and Santa Barbara as R. J. Bentson. Ruscio made repeated guest appearances on The Lawless Years, The Untouchables, The Rockford Files, Lou Grant, Barney Miller, Hill Street Blues, and 7th Heaven. He also had recurring roles on Falcon Crest, Scarecrow and Mrs. King, Life Goes On, and Manhattan, AZ. Although typically cast in guest spots, Ruscio has co-starred in three short-lived series: Shannon (1981–1982, starring Kevin Dobson), Steambath (1983), and Joe's Life (1993).

In addition to television work, Ruscio had roles in several films including Any Which Way You Can (1980) with Clint Eastwood, Jagged Edge (1985) starring Glenn Close and Jeff Bridges, The Godfather Part III (1990), Guilty by Suspicion (1991) with Robert De Niro, Showgirls (1995) and The Phantom (1996).

Later years and death 
In the 1960s Ruscio left Los Angeles to create the drama department at the newly formed Midwestern College in Denison, Iowa. After five years there he moved to Windsor, Ontario, Canada, where he was professor of acting at the University of Windsor. From there he was invited to serve as artistic director of the Academy of Dramatic Art at Oakland University, where his wife also taught acting. They moved back to Los Angeles in 1975 where they resumed their acting and teaching careers.

Ruscio wrote a book, So Therefore …: A Practical Guide for Actors, which was published in 2012.

Ruscio married Kate Williamson in 1954, and they had four children together: Elizabeth, Michael, Maria and Nina; all of whom except Maria are also involved in show business. The couple remained married until Ruscio's death in November 2013; Williamson died one month later, on December 6, 2013.

Filmography

References

Obituary – Hollywood Reporter

External links
 
 
 
 

1924 births
2013 deaths
Male actors from Massachusetts
American male film actors
American male soap opera actors
American male television actors
Burials at Forest Lawn Memorial Park (Hollywood Hills)
People from Salem, Massachusetts
20th-century American male actors
21st-century American male actors
Neighborhood Playhouse School of the Theatre alumni
Academic staff of University of Windsor
Oakland University faculty
Salem High School (Massachusetts) alumni
United States Army Air Forces personnel of World War II